NorthEast United FC is an Indian professional football club based in Guwahati, Assam that competes in the Indian Super League, the top flight of Indian football. The club was founded on 13 April 2014 during the inaugural season of Indian Super League. NorthEast United represents the 8 states known as North East India, consisting of Assam, Nagaland, Manipur, Meghalaya, Sikkim, Arunachal Pradesh, Tripura and Mizoram.

History

Formation
In early 2014, it was announced that the All India Football Federation, the national federation for football in India, and IMG-Reliance would be accepting bids for ownership of eight of nine selected cities for the upcoming Indian Super League, an eight-team franchise league modeled along the lines of the Indian Premier League cricket tournament. On 13 April 2014, it was announced that the Bollywood actor John Abraham and Shillong Lajong Football Club had won the bidding for the franchise.

On 16 July 2014, the club signed Joan Capdevila, a European Championship and World Cup winning defender with Spain, as its marquee player. He said: "India is a huge country and it should be a privilege for me to be a small part in popularizing this global game here and working with the young talented footballers of North East India".

On 19 August the club hired its first manager, New Zealander Ricki Herbert, who had represented his nation at the 1982 World Cup and managed New Zealand at the 2010 World Cup.

2014 season: Inaugural season

On 13 October 2014, the team won their first ISL match at the Indira Gandhi Stadium, with Spaniard Koke scoring the only goal of the game to defeat Kerala Blasters. The team did not make the end-of-season play-offs, finishing in last place among the eight teams.

2015 season: Narrowly missed play-offs
For their second season, NorthEast United signed former Portugal international Simão Sabrosa as their new marquee signing. On 1 July 2015, the team announced their manager for the 2015 season, former Venezuela national coach, César Farías. The team lost all three of their opening matches with Simão absent through injury, but then earned a 2–0 home win over Chennaiyin FC in which the marquee player won and dispatched an added-time penalty kick to open the scoring. The club entered the top-four for semi-finals by the end of the season but lost their position to Chennaiyin, who defeated Pune City to gain 3 points and secure the spot.

2016 season: Nelo Vingada, Velez, Alfaro era
On 13 May 2016, NorthEast United announced Sérgio Farias as the club's new manager. However, Farias joined his former club Suphanburi FC for a second stint forcing NorthEast United to look for a new coach. On 9 July 2016, NorthEast United officially announced Sérgio Farias' exit. On 23 July 2016, NorthEast United announced Nelo Vingada as the club's new manager. The club also appointed Francisco Bruto Da Costa as their Assistant Manager. The club again got a chance to enter the top-four for semi-finals if they defeat Kerala Blasters, but lost and hence, losing their semi-final chance. The club scored 14 goals and conceded 14 goals in that season. More than half of the goals (8) were scored by the South American duo Nicholas Velez and Emiliano Alfaro with 3 and 5 goals respectively.

2017–18 season: A forgettable campaign
On 17 July 2017, in hope for a great season NorthEast United signed the young Portuguese manager Joao Carlos Pires de Deus. After playing its preseason games in Antalya, Turkey. The team began its season against the ISL debutants Jamshedpur FC. The game ended in a draw with neither side managing to find the back of the net despite NorthEast playing against a 10 men Jamshedpur in the last 20 minutes. Next they played Chennaiyin FC in Chennai, where they failed to keep the record of never losing in Chennai after losing 3–0. NorthEast witnessed their first win of the season where they defeated Delhi Dynamos 0–2 in the opponent's ground. The first goal of the match came from Marcinho in the 17th minute, when a cross by Halicharan Narzary from the left flank found him unmarked inside the box. The second goal came from the striker Danilo in the 22nd minute, when he pressured the Delhi custodian Albino Gomes and made him make error inside his own box, leaving an open goal for Danilo to score his first and last goal of the season and, 500th goal of the league. It was followed by a 4 match losing streak right after which the Portuguese manager was sacked. The team management brought in the ex-Chelsea boss Avram Grant as a technical advisor who acted as a caretaker manager in the absence of Joao. He was later promoted to Head Coach on 12 January 2018, after the team released an official statement about Joao's sacking. The team won 2 out of the first 3 games under Grant, where they defeated FC Goa 2–1 and Chennaiyin FC 3–1 at home. Seiminlen Doungel scored the first ever hat-trick for NorthEast United in that match. The team failed to win a single match after that, ending the season in a long 8 match winless streak in which they drew 1 match and lost all other matches. During the league season, they managed to win only 3 matches with a total score of 12, and they finished at the lowest position in the league points table. This had happened once before, in the inaugural season, but their score that time had been better. Thus, this was the worst season for the club in its existence.

On 19 February 2018, the All India Football Federation (AIFF) announced the Indian Super Cup as a replacement for the Federation Cup. It will be played between 16 teams, the top 6 teams of ISL and I-League and the remaining 4 will be picked through a qualifier played between the bottom 4 from both league. NorthEast United participated in the Cup Qualifiers for the 4 remaining spots. NorthEast United played their qualifier match against Gokulam Kerala on 15 March 2018 which they lost 2–0 and got eliminated.

2018–19 season: Eelco Schatorrie era, maiden play-offs 
2018-19 is the fifth season of the club's existence. The season started with a positive start under coach Eelco Schatorrie with NorthEast United drawing with Goa and two consecutive wins over ATK and defending champions Chennaiyin. Against Chennaiyin, NorthEast United made a thrilling comeback after down 3–1 in 35th minute to 3–3 in first half and winning the match 4–3. After Some thrilling victories against Kerala Blasters and Chennaiyan the club strengthened its way to the playoffs. After playing 17 matches and getting 28 points Northeast United finally qualified for the playoffs with Jamshedpur losing a chance to the playoffs with a draw against Chennaiyan FC and also for Super Cup. They lost the fewest matches and conceded the fewest goals of any team in the league. They also made a club record of 29 points. Former Nigerian international Bartholomew Ogbeche became the highest goalscorer of the club scoring 12 goals. NorthEast United became a major force in the league driven by the trio of Borges-Ogbeche-Gallego. They defeated Bengaluru in the first leg of semi-finals with 'Boot Jolokia' Mascia scoring in the dying moments in the game. Northeast United lost their second leg against Bengaluru which also saw Federico Gallego getting injured. The aggregate score was 4–2.

In the Super Cup, the team reached quarter-finals after fellow northeastern club NEROCA didn't play the match in round of 16 hence, giving them a walkover. In the quarter-finals, they lost to Chennaiyin by 1–2. After a successful season, the team was 'dismantled'. Head Coach Schattorie and top-scorer Ogbeche moving to Kerala Blasters, Borges moving to Mumbai City.

2019–20 season 

The club appointed Robert Jarni, as their head coach and also signed the Ghanaian legend Asamoah Gyan and Indian U17 youngsters Ninthoi Meetei and Lalengmawia. The season started well for the club and they managed to stay unbeaten for 6 games and on the top half of the table. But the club failed to carry on the momentum and remained winless for the rest of the season. The club also lost their scoring boots not managing to score in 6 matches out of 7 matches that followed and losing its Marquee striker Asamoah Gyan to an injury in the early half of the season. The head coach Robert Jarni was sacked in the later half of the season and replaced by Assistant Manager and Head of academy Khalid Jamil. Robert Jarni managed his final match against Jamshedpur which ended in a 3–3 draw. The club failed to reach the play-offs, and were at 9th place at the end of the season.

2020–22 season: Khalid Jamil era
The club appointed Gerard Nus, a Spanish manager as their head coach and also signed the Mauritanian international Khassa Camara, Ghanaian striker Kwesi Appiah and Belgian defender Benjamin Lambot. The club announced the retention of their star goalkeeper Subashish Roy and some local Indian players. They also retained Uruguyan midfielder Federico Gallego. They signed some Indian players including Rocharzella, Imran, Ashutosh Mehta and Gurjinder Kumar. They signed Luis Machado, Idrissa Sylla and Dylan Fox as their AFC player. The team played their first match of the season against Mumbai City and won it by 1-0 as Kwesi Appiah scored a penalty. The club parted ways with coach Gerard Nus after 11 matches in the ISL season. He was replaced by Khalid Jamil as interim head coach. Under Khalid, the club saw a nine match unbeaten run, which also helped in reaching the play-offs for second time in their history. On road to play-off, they also made a ten match unbeaten run, their longest ever. The club drew 1–1 with ATK Mohun Bagan in first leg of semi-final and lost the second leg 1–2, thus ending their campaign with 2–3 on aggregate and 11 game unbeaten run.

On 23 October 2021, Jamil was appointed as the head coach of NorthEast United, making him the first Indian permanent head coach of an ISL club. Under his guidance, NorthEast began its 2021–22 Indian Super League campaign on 20 November with a 4–2 loss to Bengaluru FC. NorthEast United FC had a forgetful 2021–22 season after the highs of the 2020–21 season. They had a sluggish start to the season as injuries and issues off the pitch dictated their on field performances. The ISL's first ever Indian head coach Khalid Jamil failed to live up to everyone's expectations as the Highlanders finished 10th on the league standings.

2022–23 season

On 11 August 2022, NorthEast United announced the signing of Marco Balbul as their manager for the upcoming season. NorthEast United appointed Paul Groves and Floyd Pinto as their assistant manager for the upcoming season.

Crest, colours and kits

The crest of NorthEast United FC is featured with 8 stars at the top representing each state of Northeast India. The crest is designed with red, black and white applications, with the club name written in bold letters between the main crest and the stars. The club changed the crest with an entirely gold crest for its third season of ISL. It was changed back to the original color after the end of the season.

Kit evolution

Kit manufacturers and shirt sponsors

Stadium

NorthEast United FC plays their home matches at the Indira Gandhi Athletic Stadium, Guwahati. In 2014, to meet FIFA regulations, the stadium was renovated and its capacity was increased from 12,000 to 35,000. Indira Gandhi Athletic Stadium hosted the opening ceremony of ISL 2016. NorthEast had the highest attendance on 20 October 2016, when a record attendance of 32,844 turned up to witness the match between NorthEast United and Chennaiyin FC. The capacity was again reduced to 23,850 after the installation of bucket seats for the 2017 FIFA U-17 World Cup. The stadium saw the lowest attendance in the history of ISL when only 1,121 fans turned up to witness the match played between NorthEast United and Kerala Blasters on 17 February 2018.

From 2020 to 2022, due to COVID-19 pandemic, all the games were played in the state of Goa. Club played their home games at Tilak Maidan Stadium, Vasco da Gama for 2020–21 season and Fatorda Stadium, Margao for 2021–22 season.

Supporters 

The unofficial supporters group of the club is the Highlander Brigade.
The fan club can be traced back to its roots where it was merely a WhatsApp group formed out of a handful of followers of a Facebook page "NorthEast United FC Fans". They not only support NorthEast United but also support the Indian team.

Before the fourth season of the Indian Super League, keeping an eye on the occasion, a major chunk of the group members decided to meet and attempt to do something big. And under the tutelage of key members helming certain responsibilities, the Brigade grew and spread out rapidly.

The Highlander Brigade host football-related events in the city. To ensure that the football culture remains proactive in the city, the brigade plans to indulge in more fan activities in the future as well.

Even after a lacklustre fourth season for the club, the Highlander Brigade could be seen cheering them on with the red-white-black flags and banners thumping down the beats.

Players

Current squad

Out on loan

Ownership
NorthEast United is owned by John Abraham, who is an Indian Bollywood actor, producer and former model. They also have Jaya Balan, a perfume businessman as their partner and co-owner.

The consortium that bid for the franchise also included then Meghalaya based I-League club Shillong Lajong FC and their owner Larsingh Ming Sawyan, and Guwahati-based businessman Sanjiv Narain. Sanjiv Narain exited before the start of the first season, while Shillon Lajong exited the partnership by the end of second season.

During his younger days, John had an ambition for playing football for India before becoming an actor. When he got the opportunity for investing in a football club during the formation of ISL, instead of investing in his hometown of Mumbai, he invested in Northeast India, a football hotbed in the country. His wife Priya Runchal is the chairperson of the club.

Personnel

Current technical staff

Management

Statistics and records

Reserves and academy

Statistics and records

Season-by-season

Honours

League
 GSA C Division
Champions (1): 2022

Cup
 Swargadeo Sarbananda Singha Memorial Trophy
Runners-up (2) : 2021, 2022

 Naroram Barman Memorial Football Tournament
Champions : 2023

AFC club ranking

eSports
The organizers of ISL introduced eISL, a FIFA video game tournament, for the ISL playing clubs, each represented by two players. NorthEast United FC hosted a series of qualifying games for all the participants wanting to represent the club in eISL. On 20 November the club announced the signing of the two players.

Roster

See also
 List of NorthEast United FC managers
 List of NorthEast United FC players
 List of NorthEast United FC records and statistics
 List of NorthEast United FC seasons
 List of football clubs in India

References

External links

 

NorthEast United FC at ESPN
Team info at Global Sports Archive

 
Football clubs in Assam
Indian Super League teams
Association football clubs established in 2014
2014 establishments in Assam